Melissa Collins (born September 25, 1976) is a Canadian water polo player. She was part of the fifth place women's water polo team at the 2000 Summer Olympics and was part of the bronze medal winning women's water polo team at the 2001 World Championships in Fukuoka, Japan.

Born in Montreal, Quebec, she is a student at McGill University as a dietetics and human nutrition graduate student and received her BSc(PT)'98.

See also
 Canada women's Olympic water polo team records and statistics
 List of World Aquatics Championships medalists in water polo

References

External links
 

1976 births
Anglophone Quebec people
Canadian female water polo players
Living people
McGill University Faculty of Agricultural and Environmental Sciences alumni
Olympic water polo players of Canada
Water polo players from Montreal
Water polo players at the 2004 Summer Olympics
World Aquatics Championships medalists in water polo
Pan American Games silver medalists for Canada
Pan American Games medalists in water polo
Water polo players at the 2003 Pan American Games
Medalists at the 2003 Pan American Games